Kenneth James Grieves (27 August 1925 – 3 January 1992) was an Australian first class cricketer who played for Lancashire. A middle order batsman, he made 452 first-class appearances for Lancashire and made a county record 555 catches. He often fielded at first slip and in 1951 he took eight catches in a match against Sussex, six of them in one innings.
 
Grieves was born in Sydney, Australia and moved to England in 1947 where he pursued a football career. He played for Bury, Bolton Wanderers and Stockport County, making a total of 147 Football League appearances as a goalkeeper between 1947 and 1958. He also played for Wigan Athletic in 1951–52, appearing seven times in the Lancashire Combination.

His attention soon turned to cricket and he joined Lancashire in 1949. He had previously played some games with New South Wales when in Australia. In his 16-year career he captained Lancashire in 1963 and 1964.

References

External links

Ken Grieves, Post War English & Scottish Football League A - Z Player's Database

1925 births
1992 deaths
Australian cricketers
New South Wales cricketers
Lancashire cricketers
Lancashire cricket captains
Commonwealth XI cricketers
Australian soccer players
Association football goalkeepers
Australian expatriate soccer players
Expatriate footballers in England
Bury F.C. players
Bolton Wanderers F.C. players
Stockport County F.C. players
English Football League players
Cricketers from Sydney
Wigan Athletic F.C. players
North v South cricketers